Free as a Bird is the ninth studio album by the English rock band Supertramp, released in October 1987, and their last album of new music for A&M Records.

The album was a turn of direction of sorts, with most of the songs stepping back from their progressive rock sound, employing synthesised dance beats and rhythms. Chief songwriter Rick Davies later recalled, "Free as a Bird was an experiment to try and be modern and build it up with computers and drum machines and have people come in one by one, which makes you lose the band spirit a little bit." In the liner notes to the 2005 compilation Retrospectacle, Davies said, "Each time we went in, we would try to give it something a bit different. Free as a Bird was a lot more machine-based than anything we'd done before. That was good and bad, but it had some interesting songs on it."

Overview 
Free as a Bird was the first Supertramp album to feature contributions from guitarist/vocalist Mark Hart. He would later become a full-fledged member of the group, as would trumpet player Lee Thornburg.

Despite the fact that "I'm Beggin' You" was a club chart-topping hit and Free as a Birds title cut was a minor hit, the album did not do well peaking at No. 101, making it the first Supertramp album since 1971's Indelibly Stamped not to crack Billboard's Top 100 on the album charts.

The band disbanded after the tour in support of the album and would not reconvene until 1997. They did so without bassist Dougie Thomson.

A remastered CD version of the album was released on 30 July 2002 on A&M Records. The remastered CD comes with all of the original album artwork, lyrics and credits.

Artwork
Originally, the vinyl album featured four color variants – blue (pictured), green, yellow and pink. The bird in the picture was a cut-out.

The cover depicts a photograph of Georges Braque in his studio, painting a stylized bird. The bird silhouette also appeared on the LP and CD label.

Reception

AllMusic's Stephen Thomas Erlewine brief retrospective review dismissed Free as a Bird as "a colorless and tuneless collection of prog rock meandering".

Track listing
All songs written by Rick Davies except where noted.

 Called in digital platforms and Supertramp's official page as "Where I Stand with you". Always titled "Where I Stand" on any CD, LP or cassette.

Personnel
Supertramp
Rick Davies – keyboards, vocals, timbales on track 1
John Helliwell – saxophone, brass
Dougie Thomson – bass
Bob Siebenberg – drums, percussionAdditional personnelMark Hart – keyboards, guitars, vocals
Marty Walsh – guitar, background vocals
Lee Thornburg – trumpet, brass
Nick Lane – brass
Scott Page – brass
Lon Price – brass
David Woodford – brass
Steve Reid – percussion
Linda Foot – background vocals
Lise Miller – background vocals
Evan Rogers – background vocals
Karyn White – background vocalsProduction Rick Davies – producer
 Tom Lord-Alge  – mixing, co-producer on "It's Alright"
 Supertramp – producer
 Norman Hall – engineer
 Bob Loftus – assistant engineer
 Jeff Lorenzen – assistant engineer
 Bob Ludwig – original LP mastering
 Greg Calbi – remastering
 Jay Messina – remastering
 Richard Frankel – art direction
 Richard Frankel – design
 Raul Vega – photography2002 A&M reissueThe 2002 A&M Records reissue was mastered from the original master tapes by Greg Calbi and Jay Messina at Sterling Sound, New York, 2002. The reissue was supervised by Bill Levenson with art direction by Vartan and design by Mike Diehl, with production coordination by Beth Stempel.

Charts

Weekly charts

Year-end charts

Certifications and sales

SinglesCharts' – Billboard (United States)

Official Charts (United Kingdom)

References

Supertramp albums
1987 albums
A&M Records albums
Albums produced by Tom Lord-Alge
Albums produced by Rick Davies